The Kharkov Superior Cup was a golf tournament on the Challenge Tour. It was played for the first time in September 2013 at the Superior Golf & Spa Resort in Kharkiv, Ukraine.

Daan Huizing won the inaugural event by two strokes over Sihwan Kim.

The 2014 event was not held for security reasons.

Winners

References

External links
Coverage on the Challenge Tour's official site

Former Challenge Tour events
Golf in Ukraine
Sport in Kharkiv